Toyokazu is a masculine Japanese given name.

Possible writings
Toyokazu can be written using different combinations of kanji characters. Here are some examples:

豊一, "bountiful, one"
豊多, "bountiful, many"
豊和, "bountiful, harmony"
豊数, "bountiful, number"

The name can also be written in hiragana とよかず or katakana トヨカズ.

Notable people with the name
Toyokazu Fujishima (藤島 豊和, born 1981), Japanese golfer.
Toyokazu Nomura (野村 豊和, born 1949), Japanese judoka.
Toyokazu Orikasa (折笠 豊和, born 1977), Japanese jockey.

Japanese masculine given names